NCMP may mean: 

National Common Minimum Programme of the UPA, a political coalition ruling India since 2004
NATO Command Military Police
Non-constituency Member of Parliament of Singapore